Mahbob-U-lah Koshani is a citizen of Afghanistan who was a candidate in Afghanistan's 2009 Presidential elections.

Academic career

Koshani graduated from Habibia high school, and subsequently earned a master's degree from Moscow University, in economics.

Political career

Koshani was a member of Afghanistan's Revolutionary Labor Union, served on its executive committee, and eventually became the head of the union.

The Revolutionary Labor Union merged with other political parties in 2007, to form the Afghanistan Liberal Party.
Koshani became the deputy head of the new party.

During the 2009 Presidential elections he stood 13th in a field of 38.
He won 5,572 votes.

References

1944 births
Living people
21st-century Afghan politicians
People from Badakhshan Province
Moscow State University alumni